Sence may refer to:

Places 
 Sence, Mavrovo and Rostuša, North Macedonia
 River Sence, which flows through West Leicestershire
 River Sence, Wigston, which flows through Great Glen and Wigston near to Leicester

People 
 Philippe Sence (born 1962), French football goalkeeper
 René Sence (1920–1998), French competitive sailor

See also 
 Sense (disambiguation)